CREC may refer to:
 China Railway Group Limited, a state-owned enterprise of the People's Republic of China
 National Institute of Technology Calicut, a technical university
 Communion of Reformed Evangelical Churches, a Protestant denomination in the United States, Canada, Japan, Russia, Hungary, and Poland
 Capitol Region Education Council, a Connecticut entity established by state statute
 Coimbatore Royal Enfield Club, a members managed Motorcycle club in Coimbatore especially for Royal Enfield owners.

fr:CREC